Euan Dickson,  (31 March 1892 – 10 March 1980) was a British-born New Zealander bomber pilot and flying ace in the First World War. Serving with the Royal Naval Air Service (RNAS) and subsequently the Royal Air Force (RAF), he flew over 150 missions flying the D.H.4 aircraft. As well as flying so many bombing missions he, and his observer, was also credited with shooting down 14 enemy aircraft. After the war he returned to New Zealand and was the first person to fly across the Cook Strait.

Early life
Dickson was born in Sheffield, Yorkshire, England where his family lived at 12 Harland Road (off Ecclesall Road) on 31 March 1882 and emigrated to New Zealand about 1912, taking a job with an engineering firm in Thames on the North Island.

First World War
In 1916 Dickson decided to return to Britain to enlist for the war. Joining the Royal Navy he was commissioned as a flight sub-lieutenant in July 1916 and was awarded his pilot's licence, number 3966, on 12 December 1916 by the Royal Aero Club.

Dickson was posted to 10 Squadron RNAS in March 1917 but in April was transferred to No. 5 Squadron RNAS. This squadron was a bomber squadron flying the Airco D.H. 4 two-seater biplane aircraft and it was in this type that Dickson flew all his combat missions. On 18 December 1917 Dickson was awarded the Distinguished Service Cross (DSC) for his part in a bombing mission. The citation for his award reads:

Promoted to temporary flight lieutenant in December 1917, a Bar to the DSC was won in March 1918 for coming to the aid of another aircraft which was under attack. His citation reads:

In April 1918, the Royal Flying Corps and the RNAS were merged to form the Royal Air Force and No. 5 Squadron RNAS became No. 205 Squadron RAF. Dickson continued to fly with the squadron until August 1918, earning a Distinguished Flying Cross for his leadership, with the citation reading:

The Croix de Guerre was also awarded to Dickson by the French Army. On leaving No. 205 Squadron, he was posted to a Home Establishment in the United Kingdom until his discharge from the RAF in November 1919.

Combat victories
Dickson and the observers he flew with were credited with 14 air combat victories, 2 of which were shared with other crews.

Later life
In 1920 Dickson returned to New Zealand and on 25 August 1920 became the first person to fly the Cook Strait between North Island and South Island. Working for Canterbury Aviation he was the inaugural pilot of the first daily air mail service in New Zealand in 1921, a service between Auckland and Timaru. In later life he became chairman of the Eden Motor Company before retirement in 1964.

References

1892 births
1980 deaths
British World War I flying aces
English emigrants to New Zealand
Recipients of the Croix de Guerre 1914–1918 (France)
Recipients of the Distinguished Flying Cross (United Kingdom)
Recipients of the Distinguished Service Cross (United Kingdom)
Royal Air Force officers
Royal Air Force personnel of World War I
Royal Naval Air Service aviators
Royal Naval Air Service personnel of World War I